The UConn Huskies women's ice hockey program represented the University of Connecticut Huskies during the 2013–14 NCAA Division I women's ice hockey season. Huskies alum Jessica Lutz competed for Switzerland at the 2014 Sochi Winter Games, earning a bronze medal.

Offseason

Recruiting

Exhibition

Awards and honors
Elaine Chuli, Hockey East Co-Goaltender of the Month, January 2014
Elaine Chuli, Hockey East Honorable Mention All-Star

Team Awards
Elaine Chuli, Huskies Most Valuable Player
Erin Burns, Unsung Hero Award 
 Alexandra Lersch, Most Improved Player Award
Jessica Stott, Rookie of the Year
 Sarah MacDonnell. Pat Babcock Award

References

Connecticut
UConn Huskies women's ice hockey seasons
Conn
Connect
Connect